The Ministry of the Interior of Yugoslavia refers to the internal affairs ministry which was responsible for interior of the Kingdom of Yugoslavia from 1918 to 1945 and the communist SFR Yugoslavia from 1945 to 1992. It may also refer to the interior ministry of Serbia and Montenegro (officially named the Federal Republic of Yugoslavia) from 1992 to 2003.

List of ministers

Kingdom of Yugoslavia (1918–1941)

Yugoslav government-in-exile (1941–1945)

SFR Yugoslavia (1945–1992)

FR Yugoslavia (1992–2003)

See also
Federal Ministry of Interior (Federation of Bosnia and Herzegovina)
Ministry of Interior (Republika Srpska)
Ministry of the Interior (Croatia)
Ministry of Internal Affairs (North Macedonia)
Ministry of Internal Affairs (Montenegro)
Ministry of Internal Affairs (Serbia)
Ministry of the Interior (Slovenia)

External links
List of ministers at Rulers.org
Governments of the Kingdom of the Serbs, Croats & Slovenes (Yugoslavia) 1918–1945

Government of Yugoslavia
Yugoslavia